Ascotis terebraria is a moth of the  family Geometridae. It is found on La Réunion.

The larvae feed on Humbertia ambavila and Hypericum lanceolatum. The wingspan of the adults is approx. 30-35mm.

References

Moths described in 1862
Boarmiini
Moths of Réunion
Endemic fauna of Réunion